Gar music style is a Tibetan form of chanting and dancing.

References

Tibetan culture
Chants
Tibetan Buddhist art and culture